Richard Hine (born 11 December 1939) is a former Australian cyclist. He competed in the individual pursuit at the 1964 Summer Olympics.

References

1939 births
Living people
Australian male cyclists
Olympic cyclists of Australia
Place of birth missing (living people)
Cyclists at the 1964 Summer Olympics
Commonwealth Games medallists in cycling
Commonwealth Games silver medallists for Australia
Commonwealth Games bronze medallists for Australia
Cyclists at the 1962 British Empire and Commonwealth Games
Cyclists at the 1966 British Empire and Commonwealth Games
20th-century Australian people
21st-century Australian people
Medallists at the 1962 British Empire and Commonwealth Games
Medallists at the 1966 British Empire and Commonwealth Games